The 1877 Louisville Grays were the victim of Major League Baseball's first gambling scandal. Pitcher Jim Devlin, outfielder George Hall, utility player Al Nichols and shortstop Bill Craver were accused of throwing games at the end of the season. All four were banned from baseball for life. The team was unable to continue and folded after the season.

Regular season
After a spectacular start that included a 27–13 record to begin the season, The Grays mysteriously lost seven games in a row. Players bobbled the ball, seemed to slow between bases, swung suspiciously wide. The result was the Grays lost the pennant.

Season standings

Record vs. opponents

Roster

Player stats

Batting

Starters by position
Note: Pos = Position; G = Games played; AB = At bats; H = Hits; Avg. = Batting average; HR = Home runs; RBI = Runs batted in

Other batters
Note: G = Games played; AB = At bats; H = Hits; Avg. = Batting average; HR = Home runs; RBI = Runs batted in

Pitching

Starting pitchers
Note: G = Games pitched; IP = Innings pitched; W = Wins; L = Losses; ERA = Earned run average; SO = Strikeouts

References
1877 Louisville Grays season at Baseball Reference

Louisville Grays seasons
Louisville Grays season
Louisville Grays season